AINA is a French-based NGO founded in 2001 by world renowned photojournalist and National Geographic Fellow REZA (Reza Deghati). Aina's aim is to assist the growth of civil society in post-conflict regions through the development of cultural institutions, an independent media and the empowerment of women. As a third-generation huminatarian association, Aina contributes to the emergence of civil society through actions in the area of education (particularly focusing on women and children), information and communication. 

Aina promotes independent media development and cultural expression as a foundation of democracy. The association trains local participants, supports the local initiatives of independent media groups, and provides access to technology. As an organization, Aina is particularly focused on the education of women because they believe that empowering women is a fundamental milestone along the path to a democratic state and media. Reza believed these skills could contribute to the building of a free and open society by supporting sustainable development, promoting human rights, and strengthening social unity.  Now at the forefront of the women's movement, Aina empowers, trains and supports female journalists who will become the educated civic leaders and media teachers of Afghanistan's future. 

Since its inception, Aina has had a significant impact on civil society in Afghanistan. Over 1,000 women and men have been trained in media and communication skills, with more than 90% now employed using these skills. Eight publications have been produced and are in circulation, including two women's magazines and one children's magazine, Parvaz. In addition, "Afghanistan Unveiled", the first documentary by an all-female production team and produced by Aina, was nominated for an Emmy Award in 2005.

Mission Statement 

Aina's mission is to foster civil society, independent media, cultural identity, the empowerment of women in media and children's education through education, information and communication.

Education 

Aina supports the development of media and cultural structures and the production of educational material in a country undergoing reconstruction. Through the training and cultural leaning it provides, Aina contributes to Afghan education and promotes a spirit of peace and freedom, the very foundation of democracy. Aina's cross-disciplinary training program is based on new technologies, introducing participants to the electronic age. It is first and foremost intended for women and children whose development has long been neglected in Afghan society.

Projects

Radio Station & Training for Women

Video Production Unit for Women

AINA also produces Afghani-made films. One of the films is a documentary entitled "Afghanistan Unveiled," which was made by thirteen Afghan women, including Jamila Emami and Gul Makai Rangbar under the direction of Brigitte Brault, a French journalist. It premiered July 16, 2003 at a luncheon at the National Geographic Society in Washington, DC. The National Geographic Society then provided AINA a grant of $50,000 to fund the children's magazine, Parvaz.

Photo Journalism Institute for Women

Mobile Cinema

Another project in Afghanistan run by AINA and funded by the United Nations, the International Organization for Migration, Britain's Department for International Development and the European Commission, involves mobile cinemas. In five-month periods in both 2002 and 2003, eight mobile cinemas travelled Afghanistan, bringing educational films to nearly a million people across the country. It is estimated that in 2002, the program reached 450,000 people in six weeks. Under the direction of coordinator Nicolas Delloye, the 2003 goal was to reach twice that. To reach the goal, eight mobile cinema teams were to spend five months roaming Afghanistan, reaching 1,000 villages. The three 30-minute education films involved ("Our School" by Ahad Zhwand, "The Afghan Cultural Heritage" by Waheed Ramaqh, and "The Voice of the Heart" by Mirwais Rekab) were made under Afghan Films.

AINA estimates that less than 20% of Afghanis have ever seen a film before. Films and most other forms of entertainment were banned under the Taliban rule between 1996 and 2001. Furthermore, less than 10% of Afghanistan's population has access to electricity.

External links
AINA homepage
AINA Photo
Afghanistan through Afghan eyes

Mass media in Afghanistan

fr:Aïna